Paralauterborniella is a genus of non-biting midges in the subfamily Chironominae of the bloodworm family Chironomidae. Apedilum was formerly considered a junior synonym of this genus, but was restored as a separate genus by J. H. Epler (1988) for the species A. elachistus and A. subcinctum.

Species
P. ershanensis Tang, 2016
P. nigrohalteralis (Malloch, 1915)

References

Chironomidae
Diptera of Europe